StopAntisemitism.org is an American non-profit watchdog organization focused on combating antisemitism.

History
According to the Connecticut Jewish Ledger, social media influencer Liora Rez founded StopAntisemitism.org in 2018 to monitor and expose online antisemitism. Its stated mission as of 2019 was "Holding Antisemites Accountable and Creating Consequences For Their Actions".

In October 2019, StopAntisemitism.org sent a petition with 2,000 signatures to the US Department of Education calling on the agency to keep the Council on American-Islamic Relations (CAIR) out of college campuses. The petition said CAIR pushes "Islamist propaganda, anti-Semitism, and anti-American bias" onto college campuses.

StopAntisemitism has reported instances of alleged antisemitism from figures such as Ferris State University professor Thomas Brennan, television personality Alton Brown, activist Marc Lamont Hill, and journalist Christiane Amanpour.

Starting in 2019, the organization began a yearly competition to select a figure to be named "Antisemite of the Year". Thousands of people voted in a poll, which resulted in Ilhan Omar beating out Louis Farrakhan and Richard B. Spencer as the inaugural winner of the contest.

In 2020, StopAntisemitism.org named CUNY School of Law student and Palestinian activist Nerdeen Kiswani "Antisemite of the Year"; StopAntisemitism.org accused Kiswani of, among other things, glorifying terrorism and promoting violence in her social media posts and public speaking, and posted a video of Kiswani pretending to threaten to set on fire an Israel Defense Forces hoodie worn by a friend. Kiswani said the video was three years old, and criticized the organization. The organization's naming of Kiswani came in response to an effort by a group of anti-Zionist CUNY students, many of them Jewish, to pass an alternate definition of antisemitism in the student senate rather than the IHRA definition.

In December 2022, StopAntisemitism named Kanye West the "Antisemite of the Year".

References

Organizations established in 2018
Jewish organizations based in the United States
Opposition to antisemitism in the United States
Zionism in the United States
Zionist organizations